Carinne Leduc is a Canadian film director, screenwriter and actress.

She has won the Borso Award at the Whistler Film Festival for Best Actress, Best Actress at the Salento International Film Festival and was nominated at the Genie Awards for "Best Actress in a Leading Role" for her role in 3 Saisons.

In addition to directing commercials and music videos, she directed the short films Les Grébiches, Lemonade and B. She co-wrote the award winning feature film 3 Saisons.

References

Sources
 
 https://web.archive.org/web/20150909093232/http://www.willifest.com/2015/films

External links
 

Film directors from Quebec
Year of birth missing (living people)
Living people
Place of birth missing (living people)
Canadian women film directors
Canadian film actresses
Actresses from Quebec
French Quebecers